I.CX is a messaging and file sharing web application providing end-to-end encryption without any download or installation. It was developed by the Toronto firm EveryBit, and relies on the open-source EveryBit.js framework. All encryption is done client-side in the users web browser. All files and messages stored and sent using I.CX are protected with 256-bit AES encryption.

References

Cryptographic software
Free software
Internet privacy software